The Compagnie Centrale de Réassurance (Central Reinsurance Company) is a parastatal reinsurance corporation headquartered in Algiers, Algeria. Founded in October 1973, it is wholly owned by the Ministry of Finance.

History 
Decree No. 73-54 of 1 October 1973 established the Compagnie Centrale de Réassurance and approved its articles of association.

The CCR is a public establishment of an industrial and commercial nature whose purpose is to carry out reinsurance operations in all its forms, contribute to the development of the national reinsurance market and increase the market's capacity and retention.

Placed under the supervision of the Ministry of Finance, the CCR was upon its creation, the only entity authorized to carry out reinsurance operations with foreign countries, either in the form of acceptances or retrocessions.

At the time of its creation, CCR inherited the reinsurance portfolios of the direct companies existing at the time, namely CAAR, SAA and the Caisse Nationale Mutuelle d'Assurance (CNMA).

Share capital 
The Compagnie Centrale de Réassurance is a 100% state-owned company. It started its activities with a share capital of 40 000 000 DZD (10 128 000 USD).

In 2020, the company's share capital reached 25 000 000 000 DZD (190 000 000 USD).

Several capital increases have been initiated between 1987 and 2020:

Shareholding 
The Algerian Ministry of Finance is the sole shareholder of CCR.

CEOs and general managers

2021 board of directors

Chairmanship of the board of directors and general management

Main activities 
CCR underwrites both national and international facultative reinsurance treaties and risks. The reinsurer's activity includes life and non-life classes of business/

In 2020, CCR's turnover reached 33 624 million DZD (242 462 000 USD).

National acceptances represent 82% of the 2020 turnover while international business is limited to 18% and is mainly composed of treaties in the non-life classes of business.

CCR's holdings in insurance and reinsurance companies

Insurance pools 
CCR manages three insurance pools:

Algerian Catastrophe Insurance Pool (ACIP) 
The natural catastrophe pool (ACIP) covers earthquake, flood, landslide and storm risks. Quota-share reinsurance treaties set the risk retention rate, namely 30% for the insurers and 70% for CCR.

A stop loss treaty protects cedants in the event of a high loss experience.

Decennial liability pool 
The decennial liability pool was created in 2009 by CCR and a group of Algerian insurers. The pool's initial capital is 2 billion DZD (27.96 million USD). The co-insurance's management has been entrusted to the Compagnie Centrale de Réassurance.

Special risk pool 
The special risk pool was established in 2018. It provides protection against political risks, civil unrest, acts of terrorism, etc. CCR manages this pool.

References 

Reinsurance companies
Companies based in Algiers
Government-owned companies of Algeria
Companies established in 1973